The men's 800 metres event at the 2016 IAAF World U20 Championships was held at Zdzisław Krzyszkowiak Stadium on 22, 23 and 24 July.

Medalists

Records

Results

Heats
Qualification: First 4 of each heat (Q) and the 4 fastest times (q) qualified for the semifinals.

Semifinals
Qualification: First 2 of each heat (Q) and the 2 fastest times (q) qualified for the final.

Final

References

800 metres
800 metres at the World Athletics U20 Championships